Joachim Ziegler (2 October 1904 – 2 May 1945) was a high-ranking commander in the Waffen-SS of Nazi Germany during World War II. He was a commander of the SS Division Nordland, and was a recipient of the Knight's Cross of the Iron Cross with Oak Leaves.

Career
Ziegler was awarded the Spanish Cross for his participation in the Spanish Civil War, fighting in the Condor Legion. In 1939 he served as the adjutant in the 3rd Panzer Brigade and on 23 September 1939 he was awarded the Iron Cross 2nd class followed by a 1st class award on 28 June 1940. On 14 March 1943 he was promoted to Oberst and served on the General Staff of the XXXXII Army Corps. He was awarded the German Cross in Gold on 15 March 1943 and later was invited by the Wehrmacht to a command position in the Waffen-SS. His SS number was 491,403. From 20 June 1943 Ziegler was the Chief of General Staff of the III (Germanic) SS Panzer Corps, and in November 1943 he was granted permission to wear an SS uniform for the duration of his command.

When Fritz von Scholz was killed in action on 28 July 1944, he was asked to take over command of the 11th SS Volunteer Panzergrenadier Division Nordland. On 5 September 1944 he was awarded the Knight's Cross for the conduct of the division in action and the Oak Leaves later in April 1945. The division retreated into what was known as the Courland Pocket. Soviet forces launched major offensives against the German units there. From late October to December 1944, the Nordland remained in the pocket; by early December the divisional strength was down to 9,000 men. In January 1945, the division was ordered to the Baltic port of Libau, where it was evacuated by sea.

During the Battle of Berlin, the Nordland division was positioned to the south-east of the city and to the east of Tempelhof Airport. On 25 April 1945, SS-Brigadeführer Gustav Krukenberg was appointed the commander of (Berlin) Defence Sector C, which included the Nordland Division. Ziegler was relieved of his command the same day. The exact reason for the transfer of the command is not clearly known. It was requested by General Helmuth Weidling, commander of the Berlin Defence Area.

After Hitler's death on 30 April, Krukenberg assembled most of his escort made up of French volunteers of the SS Sturmbataillon "Charlemagne" for the breakout to try and get through the Soviet Red Army encirclement of that area of Berlin. They joined up with Ziegler and a larger group of Nordland troops. They crossed the Spree just before dawn. Near the Gesundbrunnen U-Bahn station they came under heavy fire and Ziegler was wounded. Ziegler died from his wounds on 2 May 1945.

Awards
 Spanish Cross in Gold with Swords (31 May 1939)
 Iron Cross (1939)
 2nd Class (23 September 1939)
 1st Class (28 June 1940)
 German Cross in Gold on 14 March 1943 as Oberstleutnant im Generalstab (in the General Staff) of XXXIX. Panzerkorps
 Knight's Cross of the Iron Cross with Oak Leaves
 Knight's Cross on 5 September 1944 as SS-Brigadeführer and commander of the 11. SS-Freiwilligen-Panzergrenadier-Division Nordland
 (848th) Oak Leaves on 28 April 1945 as SS-Brigadeführer and commander of the 11. SS-Freiwilligen-Panzergrenadier-Division Nordland

See also
List SS-Brigadeführer

Notes

References

Citations

Bibliography

 
 
 
 
 
 
 

1904 births
1945 deaths
People from Hanau
People from Hesse-Nassau
SS-Brigadeführer
Recipients of the Gold German Cross
Recipients of the Knight's Cross of the Iron Cross with Oak Leaves
Condor Legion personnel
Waffen-SS personnel killed in action
German Army officers of World War II